This is a list of episodes of the fourth season of The Ellen DeGeneres Show, which aired from September 2006 to June 2007.

Episodes

References

External links
 

4
2006 American television seasons
2007 American television seasons